Nicolai Wael (born 10 May 1972) is a Danish football manager. He was most recently the manager of Ringkøbing IF.

In April 2013 it was announced that he would replace Thomas Thomasberg as manager of FC Fredericia form the beginning of the 2013–14 season. He was sacked on 13 April 2015 due to a poor stint of 15 games without a win.

On 31 October 2015 he was named new manager of Ringkøbing IF in the Denmark Series. In 2017 he managed to get the club promoted to the Danish 2nd Divisions. He was sacked on 15 June 2020 with the club placed in the relegation zone.

References

External links
DBU Profile

1972 births
Living people
Danish men's footballers
Denmark under-21 international footballers
Denmark youth international footballers
Danish football managers
Kjøbenhavns Boldklub players
F.C. Copenhagen players
Næstved Boldklub players
Lyngby Boldklub players
Vejle Boldklub players
Odense Boldklub players
SønderjyskE Fodbold players
Vejle Boldklub managers
FC Fredericia managers
Ringkøbing IF managers
Association football midfielders
People from Vallensbæk Municipality
Danish 1st Division managers
Sportspeople from the Capital Region of Denmark